Ladies Love Danger is a 1935 American comedy film directed by H. Bruce Humberstone and written by Samson Raphaelson, Robert Ellis and Helen Logan. The film stars Mona Barrie, Gilbert Roland, Donald Cook, Adrienne Ames, Hardie Albright and Herbert Mundin. The film was released on May 3, 1935, by Fox Film Corporation.

Plot

Cast

Mona Barrie as Rita Witherspoon
Gilbert Roland as Ricardo Souchet aka Alonzo
Donald Cook as Tom Lennox
Adrienne Ames as Adele Michel
Hardie Albright as Phil Morton
Herbert Mundin as Giffins
Dick Foran as Sergeant Bender 
Marion Clayton Anderson as Helen Lopez 
Ray Walker as Haskins
Henry Kolker as Jose Lopez
Russell Hicks as Melvin
John Wray as Lieutenant Roberts
Leonard Carey as James
Fred Toones as Lewis 
Rita Rozelle as Conchita

References

External links 
 

1935 films
1930s English-language films
Fox Film films
American comedy films
1935 comedy films
Films directed by H. Bruce Humberstone
American black-and-white films
1930s American films